William McKenzie Thomson MC, DFC (15 September 1898 – 9 July 1987) was a Canadian First World War flying ace, officially credited with 26 victories while flying Bristol Fighters with 20 Squadron of the Royal Flying Corps and Royal Air Force.

Text of citations

Military Cross
"T./Lt. William MacKenzie Thomson, R.A.F.
For conspicuous gallantry and devotion to duty on offensive patrols. In five days he destroyed as many enemy machines. He showed fine determination to close with the enemy, and set a splendid example of enterprise and gallantry."

Distinguished Flying Cross
"Lieut. William McKenzie Thomson, M.C.
This officer has destroyed thirteen enemy machines, invariably displaying courage, determination and skill. Disparity in numbers never daunts him. On a recent occasion, in company with eight other machines, his formation was attacked by twenty-five scouts; he shot one down. On another occasion his formation of ten machines engaged between twenty and thirty Fokkers; in the combat that ensued this officer shot down one out of the four that were destroyed."

References

Notes

References

External links

Canadian aviators
Canadian World War I flying aces
Canadian recipients of the Military Cross
Recipients of the Distinguished Flying Cross (United Kingdom)
Royal Flying Corps officers
1898 births
1987 deaths
People from Lachine, Quebec